The Village of Valley Forge is an unincorporated settlement located on the west side of Valley Forge National Historical Park at the confluence of Valley Creek and the Schuylkill River in Pennsylvania, United States. The remaining village is in Schuylkill Township of Chester County, but once spanned Valley Creek into Montgomery County. The name Valley Forge is often used to refer to anywhere in the general vicinity of the park, and many places actually in King of Prussia, Trooper, Oaks, and other nearby communities will use the name, leading to some ambiguity on the actual location of the modern village.

There is a partial re-creation of the historic village from the time of the American Revolution that is located next door, and just within the outskirts of the park.

Valley Forge is known by travelers in the Philadelphia area as the westbound control city on Interstate 76 (the Schuylkill Expressway), as it is near where I-76 joins the Pennsylvania Turnpike.  This remains, despite no exit being designated for Valley Forge, since the previous exit became the off-ramp to Mall Boulevard, serving King of Prussia.

Mount Joy and Valley Forges 
In 1751 there was a forge for the conversion of pig-iron into bar-iron at the mouth of the East Valley creek, a tributary of the Schuylkill River, advertised for sale as the property of Daniel Walker, Stephen Evans, and Joseph Williams. It was then called Mount Joy forge. Some years afterward it came to be known as Valley Forge. The pig-iron used at Valley Forge was hauled from Warwick furnace. In September, 1777, the forge was burned by the British, and in December the army under Washington was entrenched on Montgomery County side of Valley creek, opposite Valley Forge. General Washington's headquarters were established at the substantial stone-house of Isaac Potts. After the Revolution another Valley Forge was built on the other side of Valley creek; it was in ruins in 1816.

American Revolutionary War encampment

Valley Forge is mostly known for the lending of its name to the encampment of George Washington's Continental Army during the winter of 1777 to 1778.

Notable people 
 Tory Burch
 Andy Hummel

See also
 Valley Forge
Washington Memorial Chapel

References

External links
Old Train station

Valley Forge
Unincorporated communities in Chester County, Pennsylvania
Unincorporated communities in Pennsylvania
Populated places on the Schuylkill River